Barq va Baran-e Olya (also Romanized as Barq va Bārān-e ‘Olyā; also known as Bargbārān, Bargobārān, and Barq va Yārān) is a village in Dasht-e Zahab Rural District, in the Central District of Sarpol-e Zahab County, Kermanshah Province, Iran. At the 2006 census, its population was 31, in 7 families.

References 

Populated places in Sarpol-e Zahab County